Al Rasheed University College is a private Iraqi university established  in Baghdad, Iraq.

History 
The university was founded in 2005 but was not recognised by the Ministry of Higher Education and Scientific Research of Iraq until 2010.

See also 
 List of universities in Iraq

References

External links 
 

Rasheed
Education in Baghdad
Educational institutions established in 2005
2005 establishments in Iraq